The Consumer Action Network (CAN) is a tax-exempt, not-for-profit, professional peer advocacy program incorporated in the District of Columbia in February 2003.  The organization’s mission is to empower mental health consumers by promoting recovery and self-advocacy.

"CAN’s Executive Team consists of Directors and Co-founders Effie Smith, Director of Advocacy/Program Development, and Mary Blake, (no longer with CAN) Director of Training/Communications. Both Directors have served on national and local boards and advisory groups, including SAMHSA’s National Anti-Stigma Campaign Work Committee, the DC Partnership Council, the National Center for Trauma-informed Care, and the State Mental Health Planning Council, among others.  CAN is also a member of the newly formed National Coalition of Mental Health Consumer/Survivor Organizations (NCMHCSO)."

Sources 

Mental health organizations in Washington, D.C.